Begum Nusrat Bhutto (born as Nusrat Ispahani; 23 March 1929 – 23 October 2011) was an Iranian-Pakistani public figure of Kurdish origin, who served as the First Lady of Pakistan between 1971 until the 1977 coup, and as a senior member of the federal cabinet between 1988 and 1990.

She was born in Isfahan to a wealthy merchant family of Kurdish heritage and her family had settled in Bombay before moving to Karachi after the Partition of British India. Ispahani joined a paramilitary women's force in 1950, but left a year later when she married Zulfikar Ali Bhutto. She moved to Oxfordshire with her husband who then was pursuing his legal education. She returned to Pakistan alongside Bhutto who went on to serve as the Foreign Minister. After her husband founded the Pakistan Peoples Party, Ispahani worked to lead the party's women's wing. After Bhutto was elected as the Prime Minister in 1971, Ispahani became the First Lady of Pakistan and remained so until her husband's removal in 1977. Her daughter, Benazir Bhutto immediately succeeded her husband as the leader of the Pakistan Peoples party and, while under house arrest, fought an unsuccessful legal battle to prevent her husband's execution. After Bhutto's execution, Ispahani, along with her children, went into exile to London, from where in 1981 she co-founded the Movement for the Restoration of Democracy, a nonviolent opposition to Zia's regime.

Ispahani returned to Pakistan after her daughter Benazir made a comeback in 1986. After the People's Party's victory in 1988, she joined Benazir's cabinet as a minister without portfolio while representing Larkana District in the National Assembly. She remained in the cabinet until Benazir's government was dismissed in 1990. Afterwards, during a family dispute between her son, Murtaza, and her daughter, Benazir, Ispahani favored Murtaza leading Benazir to sack Ispahani as the party leader. Ispahani stopped talking to the media and refrained from political engagements after the assassination of her son Murtaza in 1996 during a police encounter, during her daughter's second government.

Ispahani moved to Dubai in 1996, suffering from Alzheimer's disease, she was kept out of public's eye by Benazir until her demise on 23 October 2011. In Pakistan, Ispahani is remembered for her contribution to empowerment of women in Pakistan and for advocating for democracy in Pakistan, for which she is dubbed as "Mādar-e-Jamhooriat" (English "Mother of Democracy"), a title she was honored with by the parliament following her death.

Early life, background and political career
Nusrat Ispahani was born on 23 March 1929 in Isfahan, Persia (now Iran). Her father was a wealthy businessman who came from the wealthy Hariri family of merchants in Isfahan and was of partial Kurdish descent via his mother who came from Kurdistan Province. Shortly after her birth, the family later moved to British India, where they initially lived in Bombay and then moved to Karachi before the independence of Pakistan and the Partition of India in 1947. She grew up with Iranian traditions at her home but adapted to Indian Muslim culture outside. Before emigrating to Pakistan, Nusrat attended and was educated at the University of Karachi where she obtained a Bachelor of Arts (B.A.) in Humanities in 1950.
As first lady from 1973 to 1977, Nusrat Bhutto functioned as a political worker and accompanied her husband on a number of overseas visits. In 1979, after the trial and execution of her husband, she succeeded her husband as leader of the Pakistan Peoples Party as chairman for life. She led the PPP's campaign against General Muhammad Zia-ul-Haq's regime. Alongside her daughter Benazir Bhutto, she was arrested numerous times and placed under house arrest and in prison in Sihala. Nusrat Bhutto was attacked by police with batons while attending a cricket match at Gaddafi Stadium in Lahore, when the crowd began to raise pro Bhutto slogans. In 1982, ill with cancer, she was given permission to leave the country by the military government of General Zia-ul-Haq for medical treatment in London at which point her daughter, Benazir Bhutto, became acting leader of the party, and, by 1984, the party chairman.

After returning to Pakistan in the late 1980s, she served two terms as a Member of Parliament to the National Assembly from the family constituency of Larkana, Sindh. During the administrations of her daughter Benazir, she became a cabinet minister and Deputy Prime Minister. In the 1990s, she and Benazir became estranged when Nusrat took the side of her son Murtaza during a family dispute but were later reconciled after Murtaza's murder. She lived the last few years of her life with her daughter's family in Dubai, United Arab Emirates and later suffered from the combined effects of a stroke and Alzheimer's disease.

Personal life, illness and death
Nusrat met Zulfikar Ali Bhutto in Karachi where they later got married on 8 September 1951. She was Zulfikar Ali Bhutto's second wife, and they had four children together: Benazir, Murtaza, Sanam and Shahnawaz. With the exception of Sanam, she outlived her children. Benazir's widower and Nusrat's son-in-law Asif Ali Zardari was the President of Pakistan from 9 September 2008 till 8 September 2013.
 
Besides her native Persian, Bhutto was fluent in Urdu and Sindhi.

Bhutto was suspected of suffering from cancer in 1982, the year when she left Pakistan for medical treatment. For the last several years of her life, she had also been suffering from Alzheimer's disease. In the mid-1990s, particularly after the death of her son Mir Murtaza Bhutto in 1996, she withdrew from public life. Party sources suggest this may also have coincided with the time that she began to show symptoms of Alzheimer's. According to her senior party leader, Bhutto's disease was so advanced that she was even unaware of the assassination of her daughter, Benazir. She used a ventilator until her last days. She died at the age of 82 in the Iranian Hospital Dubai on 23 October 2011. Her body was flown to her hometown of Garhi Khuda Bakhsh in the Larkana District the next day, and was buried next to her husband and children in the Bhutto family mausoleum at a ceremony attended by thousands of mourners.

Further reading

See also

 Bhutto family
 Zulfikar Ali Bhutto
 Begum Nusrat Bhutto Women University
 Begum Nusrat Bhutto Airport
 Nusrat Bhutto Colony

References

External links
  Shaheed Zulfikar Ali Bhutto
 

1929 births
2011 deaths
Spouses of prime ministers of Pakistan
Pakistan People's Party MNAs
Nusrat
Pakistani Shia Muslims
Pakistani people of Iranian descent
Pakistani people of Kurdish descent
Iranian emigrants to Pakistan
Pakistani expatriates in the United Arab Emirates
Deaths from Alzheimer's disease
Neurological disease deaths in the United Arab Emirates
People from Dubai
Politicians from Karachi
Iranian Kurdish women
Iranian expatriates in the United Arab Emirates
20th-century Pakistani women politicians
Iranian people of Kurdish descent
Kurdish politicians
Naturalised citizens of Pakistan
Pakistani prisoners and detainees
Spouses of presidents of Pakistan
Pakistani MNAs 1988–1990